Humana Press was an American academic publisher of science, technology, and medical books and journals founded in 1976. It was bought by Springer Science+Business Media in 2006.

History
Humana published more than 100 new books and 25 journals per year, with a back list of approximately 1,500 titles in areas such as molecular biology, neuroscience, cancer research, pathology, and medicine.

The company was founded in 1976 in Clifton, New Jersey by Thomas L. Lanigan and his wife, Julia Lanigan, both chemists, and published its first book in 1977. The company was acquired by Springer Science+Business Media in the fall of 2006 and continues to publish titles in a range of book series under the Humana Press imprint. The company's employees remained at its Totowa, NJ home until June 2008, when they were moved to the Springer offices in New York City.

Following the research areas of interest of its founders, Humana publications focused on the areas of molecular biology and medicine.  Humana’s flagship product was the Methods in Molecular Biology book series, which produced more than 1200 published volumes, more than 33,000 individual protocols, and an extensive online database, Springer Protocols.

Selected publications

Book series 
 Cancer Drug, Discovery, and Development
 Contemporary Cardiology
 Contemporary Endocrinology
 Current Clinical Oncology
 Current Clinical Pathology
 Current Clinical Practice
 Methods in Molecular Biology
 Methods in Molecular Medicine
 Neuromethods

Journals 
 Journal of Molecular Neuroscience
 Neuroinformatics
 Stem Cell Reviews and Reports
 Clinical Proteomics
 High Temperature and Materials Science

References

External links 
 

Academic publishing companies
Publishing companies of the United States
Book publishing companies based in New York (state)
Publishing companies established in 1976
Springer Science+Business Media imprints
1976 establishments in New Jersey